This article is a list of seasons completed by the Buffalo Bills American football franchise of the National Football League. The list documents the season-by-season records of the franchise from 1960 to present, including postseason records and league awards for individual players or head coaches.

In their time in the American Football League from 1960 to 1969, the Bills reached the AFL Championship three consecutive times from 1964 to 1966, winning twice in 1964 and 1965. They did not return to the postseason until 1974 nor win a division title until 1980.

The Bills won the AFC East in 1988 under third-year coach Marv Levy to reach their third postseason in the 1980s. They lost in the AFC Championship (their first championship appearance in AFC history), but it would be the first of six consecutive playoff appearances. In the 1990 season, they won the AFC Championship to reach their first Super Bowl. They lost in Super Bowl XXV. They reached the next three Super Bowls with victories in the AFC Championship. They made the playoffs four more times from 1995 to 1999, but they did not reach the playoffs from 2000 to 2016. In 2017, they returned to the postseason under new head coach Sean McDermott. They won their first division title in over 25 years in 2020, where they returned to the AFC Championship.

In 63 seasons of the franchise, the Bills have reached the playoffs 22 times.

Seasons

{| class="wikitable" style="text-align:center"
|+ Franchise records according to Pro-Football-Reference.com
|-
!rowspan="2"|Season
!rowspan="2"|Team
!rowspan="2"|League
!rowspan="2"|Conference
!rowspan="2"|Division
!colspan="4"|Regular season
!rowspan="2"|Postseason results
!rowspan="2"|Awards
!rowspan="2"|Head coaches
|-
!Finish
!
!
!width=2.5%|
|-
!1960 
|1960
|AFL
|
|Eastern
|3rd
|5
|8
|1
|
|
|rowspan="2"|Buster Ramsey
|-
!1961
|1961
|AFL
|
|Eastern
|4th
|6
|8
|0
|
|
|-
!1962 
|1962
|AFL
|
|Eastern
|3rd
|7
|6
|1
|
|
|rowspan="4"|Lou Saban
|-
!1963 
|1963
|AFL
|
|Eastern
|bgcolor="#CCFFFF"|2nd
|7
|6
|1
|Lost Divisional Playoffs (Patriots) 26–8
|
|-
!1964
|1964
|bgcolor="#FFE6BD"|AFL
|
|bgcolor="#D0E7FF"|Eastern
|bgcolor="#D0E7FF"|1st
|12
|2
|0
|bgcolor="#FFE6BD"|Won AFL Championship (1) (Chargers) 20–7
|Lou Saban (COY)
|-
!1965
|1965
|bgcolor="#FFE6BD"|AFL
|
|bgcolor="#D0E7FF"|Eastern 
|bgcolor="#D0E7FF"|1st
|10
|3
|1
|bgcolor="#FFE6BD"|Won AFL Championship (2) (at Chargers) 23–0
|Lou Saban (COY)
|-
!1966
|1966
|AFL
|
|bgcolor="#D0E7FF"|Eastern 
|bgcolor="#D0E7FF"|1st
|9
|4
|1
|Lost AFL Championship (Chiefs) 31–7
|Bobby Burnett (ROY)
|rowspan="2"|Joe Collier
|-
!1967
|1967 
|AFL
|
|Eastern 
|3rd
|4
|10
|0
|
|
|-
!1968
|1968 
|AFL
|
|Eastern 
|5th
|1
|12
|1
|
|
|Joe Collier (0–2) Harvey Johnson (1–10–1)
|-
!1969
|1969
|AFL
|
|Eastern 
|4th
|4
|10
|0
|
|
|rowspan="2"|John Rauch
|-
!
|1970
|NFL
|AFC
|East
|4th
|3
|10
|1
|
|Dennis Shaw (OROY, ROY)
|-
! 
|1971
|NFL
|AFC
|East
|5th
|1
|13
|0
|
|
|Harvey Johnson
|-
!
|1972
|NFL
|AFC
|East
|4th
|4
|9
|1
|
|
|rowspan="4"|Lou Saban
|-
!
|1973 
|NFL
|AFC
|East
|2nd
|9
|5
|0
|
|O. J. Simpson (MVP, OPOY)
|-
!
|1974 
|NFL
|AFC
|East
|bgcolor="#96CDCD"|2nd
|9
|5
|0
|Lost Divisional Playoffs (at Steelers) 32–14
|
|-
! 
|1975
|NFL
|AFC
|East
|3rd
|8
|6
|0
|
|
|-
!
|1976 
|NFL
|AFC
|East
|5th
|2
|12
|0
|
|
|Lou Saban (2–3)Jim Ringo (0–9)
|-
!
|1977 
|NFL
|AFC
|East
|5th
|3
|11
|0
|
|
|Jim Ringo
|-
!
|1978 
|NFL
|AFC
|East
|4th
|5
|11
|0
|
|
|rowspan="5"|Chuck Knox
|-
! 
|1979
|NFL
|AFC
|East
|4th
|7
|9
|0
|
|Jim Haslett (DROY) Jerry Butler (ROY)
|-
!
|1980
|NFL
|AFC
|bgcolor="#D0E7FF"|East|bgcolor="#D0E7FF"|1st|11
|5
|0
|Lost Divisional Playoffs (at Chargers) 20–14
|Joe Cribbs (ROY) Chuck Knox (COY)
|-
! 
|1981
|NFL
|AFC
|East
|bgcolor="#96CDCD"|3rd
|10
|6
|0
|Won Wild Card Playoffs (at Jets) 31–27Lost Divisional Playoffs (at Bengals) 28–21
|
|-
! 
|1982
|NFL
|AFC
|—
|9th
|4
|5
|0
|
|
|-
! 
|1983
|NFL
|AFC
|East
|3rd
|8
|8
|0
|
|
|rowspan="2"|Kay Stephenson
|-
!
|1984
|NFL
|AFC
|East
|5th
|2
|14
|0
|
|
|-
!
|1985 
|NFL
|AFC
|East
|5th
|2
|14
|0
|
|
|Kay Stephenson (0–4)Hank Bullough (2–10)
|-
! 
|1986
|NFL
|AFC
|East
|4th
|4
|12
|0
|
|
|Hank Bullough (2–7)Marv Levy (2–5)
|-
!
|1987 
|NFL
|AFC
|East
|4th
|7
|8
|0
|
|Shane Conlan (DROY, ROY)
|rowspan="11"|Marv Levy
|-
!
|1988
|NFL
|AFC
|bgcolor="#D0E7FF"|East|bgcolor="#D0E7FF"|1st|12
|4
|0
|Won Divisional Playoffs (Oilers) 17–10Lost AFC Championship (at Bengals) 21–10
|Marv Levy (COY)
|-
! 
|1989
|NFL
|AFC
|bgcolor="#D0E7FF"|East|bgcolor="#D0E7FF"|1st|9
|7
|0
|Lost Divisional Playoffs (at Browns) 34–30
|
|-
!
|1990 
|NFL
|bgcolor="#ddffdd"|AFC|bgcolor="#D0E7FF"|East|bgcolor="#D0E7FF"|1st|13
|3
|0
|bgcolor="#ddffdd"|Won Divisional Playoffs (Dolphins) 44–34Won AFC Championship (Raiders) 51–3Lost Super Bowl XXV (vs. Giants) 20–19
|Bruce Smith (DPOY)
|-
!
|1991 
|NFL
|bgcolor="#ddffdd"|AFC|bgcolor="#D0E7FF"|East|bgcolor="#D0E7FF"|1st|13
|3
|0
|bgcolor="#ddffdd"|Won Divisional Playoffs (Chiefs) 37–14Won AFC Championship (Broncos) 10–7Lost Super Bowl XXVI (vs. Redskins) 37–24
|Thurman Thomas (MVP, OPOY)
|-
!
|1992 
|NFL
|bgcolor="#ddffdd"|AFC|East
|bgcolor="#96CDCD"|2nd
|11
|5
|0
|bgcolor="#ddffdd"|Won Wild Card Playoffs (Oilers) 41–38 Won Divisional Playoffs (at Steelers) 24–3Won AFC Championship (at Dolphins) 29–10Lost Super Bowl XXVII (vs. Cowboys) 52–17
|
|-
!
|1993 
|NFL
|bgcolor="#ddffdd"|AFC|bgcolor="#D0E7FF"|East|bgcolor="#D0E7FF"|1st|12
|4
|0
|bgcolor="#ddffdd"|Won Divisional Playoffs (Raiders) 29–23Won AFC Championship (Chiefs) 30–13Lost Super Bowl XXVIII (vs. Cowboys) 30–13
|Marv Levy (COY)
|-
!
|1994 
|NFL
|AFC
|East
|4th
|7
|9
|0
|
|
|-
!
|1995 
|NFL
|AFC
|bgcolor="#D0E7FF"|East|bgcolor="#D0E7FF"|1st|10
|6
|0
|Won Wild Card Playoffs (Dolphins) 37–22Lost Divisional Playoffs (at Steelers) 40–21
|Bryce Paup (DPY)
|-
! 
|1996
|NFL
|AFC
|East
|bgcolor="#96CDCD"|2nd
|10
|6
|0
|Lost Wild Card Playoffs (Jaguars) 30–27
|Bruce Smith (DPY)
|-
! 
|1997
|NFL
|AFC
|East
|4th
|6
|10
|0
|
|
|-
!
|1998 
|NFL
|AFC
|East
|bgcolor="#96CDCD"|3rd
|10
|6
|0
|Lost Wild Card Playoffs (at Dolphins) 24–17
|
|rowspan="3"|Wade Phillips
|-
!
|1999 
|NFL
|AFC
|East
|bgcolor="#96CDCD"|2nd
|11
|5
|0
|Lost Wild Card Playoffs (at Titans) 22–16 
|
|-
!
|2000 
|NFL
|AFC
|East
|4th
|8
|8
|0
|
|
|-
!
|2001 
|NFL
|AFC
|East
|5th
|3
|13
|0
|
|
|rowspan=3|Gregg Williams
|-
!
|2002 
|NFL
|AFC
|East
|4th
|8
|8
|0
|
|
|-
!
|2003 
|NFL
|AFC
|East
|3rd
|6
|10
|0
|
|
|-
!
|2004 
|NFL
|AFC
|East
|3rd
|9
|7
|0
|
|
|rowspan="2"|Mike Mularkey
|-
!
|2005 
|NFL
|AFC
|East
|3rd
|5
|11
|0
|
|
|-
!
|2006
|NFL
|AFC
|East
|3rd
|7
|9
|0
|
|
|rowspan="3"|Dick Jauron
|-
!2007
|2007
|NFL
|AFC
|East
|2nd
|7
|9
|0
|
|
|-
!
|2008
|NFL
|AFC
|East
|4th
|7
|9
|0
|
|
|-
!
|2009
|NFL
|AFC
|East
|4th
|6
|10
|0
|
|
|Dick Jauron (3–6)Perry Fewell (3–4)
|-
!
|2010
|NFL
|AFC
|East
|4th
|4
|12
|0
|
|
|rowspan="3"|Chan Gailey
|-
!
|2011
|NFL
|AFC
|East
|4th
|6
|10
|0
|
|
|-
!
|2012
|NFL
|AFC
|East
|4th
|6
|10
|0
|
|
|-
!
|2013
|NFL
|AFC
|East
|4th 
|6
|10
|0
|
|Kiko Alonso (PFWA DROY)
|rowspan="2"|Doug Marrone
|-
!
|2014
|NFL
|AFC
|East
|2nd
|9
|7
|0
| 
|
|-
!
|2015
|NFL
|AFC
|East
|3rd
|8
|8
|0
| 
| 
|Rex Ryan
|-
!
|2016
|NFL
|AFC
|East
|3rd
|7
|9
|0
| 
| 
|Rex Ryan (7–8)Anthony Lynn (0–1)
|-
!
|2017
|NFL
|AFC
|East
|bgcolor="#96CDCD"|2nd
|9
|7
|0
|Lost Wild Card Playoffs (at Jaguars) 10–3
| 
| rowspan="6" |Sean McDermott
|-
!
|2018
|NFL
|AFC
|East
|3rd
|6
|10
|0
|
| 
|-
!
|2019
|NFL
|AFC
|East
|bgcolor="#96CDCD"|2nd
|10
|6
|0
|Lost Wild Card Playoffs (at Texans) 22–19 
|
|-
!
|2020
|NFL
|AFC
|bgcolor="#D0E7FF"|East|bgcolor="#D0E7FF"|1st|13
|3
|0
|Won Wild Card Playoffs (Colts) 27–24Won Divisional Playoffs (Ravens) 17–3 Lost AFC Championship (at Chiefs) 38–24
| Brian Daboll (ACOY)
|-
!
|2021
|NFL
|AFC
|bgcolor="#D0E7FF"|East|bgcolor="#D0E7FF"|1st|11
|6
|0
|Won Wild Card Playoffs (Patriots) 47–17Lost Divisional Playoffs (at Chiefs) 42–36 
|
|-
!
|2022
|NFL
|AFC
|bgcolor="#D0E7FF"|East|bgcolor="#D0E7FF"|1st|13
|3
|0
|Won Wild Card Playoffs (Dolphins) 34–31Lost Divisional Playoffs (Bengals) 27–10
| 
|-
!rowspan="4" colspan="6"|Totals  2 AFL Championships  4 AFC Conference Championships  13 Division titles
!462
!495
!8
!colspan="3"|All-time regular season record (1960–2022)
|-
!18
!20
!—
!colspan="3"|All-time postseason record (1960–2022)
|-
!480
!515
!8
!colspan="3"|All-time regular and postseason record (1960–2022)
|-
! colspan="6"|2 AFL Championships, 4 AFC Conference Championships, 13 Division titles
|}Note: Statistics are up to date 1/22/2023.'''

See also
 History of the Buffalo Bills

Footnotes

References

External links
Buffalo Bills season database

Buffalo Bills
Buffalo Bills seasons
Seasons